The William Rossiter House is a historic house at 11 Mulberry Street in Claremont, New Hampshire.  Built in 1813 and enlarged by about 1850, it is a distinctive local example of Greek Revival architecture, with many surviving Federal period features.  The house was listed on the National Register of Historic Places in 1979.

Description and history
The William Rossiter House stands in a residential area west of downtown Clarement, on the west side of Mulberry Street roughly midway between Myrtle and Sullivan Streets.  It is a -story timber-frame structure, with a gabled roof and clapboarded exterior.  The house's five-bay facade is fronted by a massive two-story Greek Revival temple portico, with fluted Ionic columns rising to a full entablature.  Its main entrance is framed by sidelight and transom windows, and has flanking pilasters and a projecting cornice above.  The interior retains a number of original Federal period finishes, including doors with original hardware, and several delicately carved fireplace surrounds.  A two-story ell extends to the rear; it has less ornate original finishes, which include crown moulding and four-panel doors.  The ell is further extended by a 20th-century garage.

The main block of this multi-section house was built in 1813 by Austin Tyler.  The ell was added, and the house given its extensive Greek Revival treatment, c. 1830-50 by William Rossiter, a prominent local businessman and politician.  Rossiter was an executive in the city's Sullivan Woolen Mills, served four terms as city selectman, and was twice elected to the state legislature.

See also
National Register of Historic Places listings in Sullivan County, New Hampshire

References

Houses on the National Register of Historic Places in New Hampshire
Federal architecture in New Hampshire
Greek Revival houses in New Hampshire
Houses completed in 1813
Houses in Sullivan County, New Hampshire
National Register of Historic Places in Sullivan County, New Hampshire
Buildings and structures in Claremont, New Hampshire